The 2016 Sacramento Republic FC season is the club's third season of existence. The club is playing in the United Soccer League (USL), the third tier of the American soccer pyramid. After off season expansion of the USL from 24 to 31 teams, Sacramento Republic FC is competing in the new Western Conference of the USL. 
The season is to begin in March 2016 and concluded in September 2016.

Background
2015 saw much growth in attendance with the expansion of Bonney Field, but this was not a sign of things to come for the club. In 2015, the Republic failed to produce on the field as they did the year before, dropping out of the playoffs in the first round. Their performance in the 2014 U.S. Open Cup was mirrored in 2015, once again losing to San Jose earthquakes in the 4th round. The 2015 season was riddled with emotional setbacks, MLS decided on Minnesota as its newest expansion over Sacramento. The Republic lost the head coach, Coach Preki, whom they felt would be the one to propel the team to the MLS. At the end of the season, the player with the most MLS experience, whom some considered the star player, Rodrigo López announced he will not be returning to Sacramento Republic, ultimately returning to Mexico and playing for Celaya FC in the Ascenso MX.

The 2016 preseason, the club looked to turn things around. The club picked up Nike as their kit manufacturers, redesigned the team jersey and, on December 2, Sacramento city council approved the Republic's MLS stadium plan with a unanimous vote. Their hopes were once again revitalized three days later, when the MLS board announced its decision to once again expand the league from 24 to 28 teams.

Sacramento Republic F.C. continued their off season productivity by extending several players contracts, including fan-favorite, Octavio Guzmán and hometown hero, Cameron Iwasa. The club's Academy contributed to the off season's ambition with its U-16 and U-18 team both going undefeated in the U.S. Soccer Development Academy Winter Showcase in Lakewood Ranch, Florida.

Club
As of September 17, 2016.

Technical Staff 
As of June 25, 2015.

Competitions

Preseason

USL

Results summary

Standings

U.S. Open Cup

Friendlies

Transfers

In

Out

Loan in

References

Sacramento Republic
Sacramento
Sacramento Republic
Sacramento Republic FC seasons